The 2012 Vuelta a España began on 18 August, and stage 11 occurred on 29 August. The 2012 edition began with a team time trial stage – where each member of a team started together racing against the clock – in Pamplona, Navarre with the race remaining in Spain until the finish to the eighth stage, with a summit finish at the Collada de la Gallina in Andorra. After the ninth stage, the race's first rest day saw the riders travel across Spain by air from Barcelona to Ponteareas; a road stage was followed by the only individual time trial of the race, where each remaining member of the starting peloton of 198 riders competed against the clock.

The  were the winners of the race-opening team time trial, recording a time ten seconds quicker than any other squad; their first rider to cross the line, Jonathan Castroviejo, became the first race leader as a result. He maintained his lead through the first mass-start stage the following day – the first of four stage victories for German sprinter John Degenkolb, who also won stages 5, 7 and 10 – but lost the lead following the first summit finish of the race in Eibar. The rojo jersey remained within the team however, as Alejandro Valverde picked up the race lead after pipping Joaquim Rodríguez in a photo-finish at the stage end. Valverde gave up the lead the following day, after crashing with several other members of his team just as the peloton's pace was being increased by the team on the front, . Rodríguez assumed the lead of the race then, but held a marginal one-second lead ahead of Chris Froome.

There were no changes in the classification until another summit finish on the sixth stage, when Rodríguez and Froome were the two contenders for the stage victory. Froome had attacked to bring himself and Rodríguez, but a second attack from Rodríguez brought him clear, and with time bonuses on the line, extended his lead to ten seconds. In Andorra, it again came down to the main favourites for the race; for a time, Alberto Contador attacked off the front and maintained a lead of around ten seconds – looking for his first victory since his return from a doping ban – before tying up and Valverde and Rodríguez beat him to the line, with Froome having cracked further back. Rodríguez put another twenty seconds into his lead the following day after attacking on the final climb, and his advantage of around a minute prior to the individual time trial was sufficient for him to maintain the lead after the stage; he put in the seventh-fastest time on the stage to keep the leader's jersey, but by only a second from Contador, who moved ahead of Froome in the classification. As a result, Rodríguez topped the overall standings with the more mountainous second half of the Vuelta still to race.

Stage 1
18 August 2012 — Pamplona, team time trial (TTT)

For the third year in succession, the Vuelta began with a team time trial; on this occasion, it began in the Navarre city of Pamplona, hosting the Vuelta for the first time since 1994 when France's Laurent Jalabert won the thirteenth stage of that year's race. The stage itself was in and around Pamplona, with the final kilometre of the stage following the route of the Running of the Bulls, held as part of the festival of San Fermín the month before. Just like the bull-run, the stage finished in the middle of the Plaza de Toros, the city's main bullring.  were the first of the race's 22 squads to begin the stage, wearing a different team kit to normal; having received dispensation from the Union Cycliste Internationale, the team wore white and red skin-suits instead of their customary green. However, with a time of 20' 18", the squad ultimately finished the stage in last place.

The teams entered the  course at four-minute intervals;  were the second team in and comfortably lowered the earlier benchmark, recording a time almost a minute quicker. , who won the team time trial in May's Giro d'Italia, were also setting a good time on course before a crash took down three of the team's riders, and delayed Andrew Talansky, the team's main general classification contender.  were the next team to top the timesheets, setting a time of 19' 01" for the course, which held for some time.  started the stage slowly but a strong second half of the course pulled them into contention for stage honours, and ultimately edged out  by a small margin.

It was not until the final team to start the stage that the time – and the 19-minute barrier – was beaten.  had the honour of starting last due to Juan José Cobo – the winner of the 2011 edition of the race for  – being amongst their nine riders. As the first rider to cross the line, Jonathan Castroviejo assumed the first red jersey of the race for the general classification leader, with four of his teammates in the same time and Cobo in sixth place, having been distanced, by four seconds, in the closing metres.

Stage 2
19 August 2012 — Pamplona to Viana, 

The opening road stage of the 2012 Vuelta saw the riders head south from Pamplona, via a loop around Tafalla – where the race's first intermediate sprint point was held – and the first categorised climb, the third-category Alto de la Chapela, before heading towards Viana. In Viana itself, there was an intermediate sprint point on the first passage through the town, before the finish second time around. With most of the  parcours being flat, it was expected to ultimately result in a sprint finish at the stage end. Terpstra ultimately dropped back into the main field to allow the gap to increase.

Between the lead trio, they swept up most of the available points on offer at the two intermediate sprint positions, while Chacón assumed the first blue-and-white polka-dot jersey for the mountains classification but only after Aramendia was assumed to have sprinted irregularly while crossing the summit of the third-category Alto de la Chapela first. Ignatiev and Aramendia were brought back several kilometres later, and despite several late attacks, the expected sprint finish materialised where  sprinter John Degenkolb took his first Grand Tour stage victory, beating 's Allan Davis and Froome's teammate Ben Swift to the line. Castroviejo maintained his overall lead by finishing with the peloton, although he was not confident of keeping it, while Chacón added the white combination jersey to his mountains lead and Degenkolb took the points lead with his stage win.

Stage 3
20 August 2012 — Faustino V to Eibar–Arrate, 

Although there were four categorised climbs over the  parcours, the final climb of the day – the first-category Alto de Arrate – was the key point of the stage. Frequently used in the Tour of the Basque Country stage race held in the spring, the Alto de Arrate climb with a gradient in places at over 11%, crested out with around  remaining of the stage, before a false flat to the finish line.

The day's breakaway was made up of eight riders, who all moved ahead of the main field inside the opening  of the stage. The octet managed to establish a lead of almost four-and-a-half minutes, despite one of its members – 's Philippe Gilbert, still winless for the year – being just ten seconds behind the leader of the general classification, Valverde's teammate Jonathan Castroviejo. At each of the three categorised climbs prior to the finishing climb, Pim Ligthart of  took maximum points on offer, leading from Gilbert at two of them, while Nico Sijmens crossed the third climb, the Puerto de Campazar, behind Ligthart and ahead of Gilbert.

Valverde was the first of the favourites to attack from the rapidly diminishing lead group, with Contador jumping onto his wheel with Rodríguez and 's Chris Froome eventually rejoining their fellow contenders. Contador then launched several more attacks – seven in all – as the lead quartet moved their way up the climb, but each time, the other three riders in the group were able to come back to him. Valverde and Rodríguez contested the sprint for the line, with Valverde taking his sixth career Vuelta stage win in a photo-finish, after Rodríguez free-wheeled in the closing metres; a move that left him furious post-stage. Valverde took the lead in the general, points and combination classifications, while Ligthart took the mountains lead.

Stage 4
21 August 2012 — Barakaldo to Estación de Valdezcaray, 

The primary breakaway of the stage was formed early in the stage, when a wave of five riders went clear.

However, just after the field had passed through the town of Haro, the crosswinds that had set the course of the day played a factor in a crash. After the stage, Valverde criticised  and blamed them for the incident. At one point, Valverde's team manager Eusebio Unzué, pulled up alongside the  car for a discussion with their sporting director Nicolas Portal.

The ramping up of the pace had split the peloton into echelons on the road, with as many as five diagonal lines of riders seconds apart from one another. World time trial champion Martin attacked his companions at the bottom of the final climb, and took Clarke with him, as the other three riders could not follow the higher pace. As it transpired, Clarke had the stronger finish, and ultimately took his first professional victory on the line. Bazayev finished third, while the peloton came in over a minute behind Clarke; Valverde lost almost a minute beyond that, and surrendered the overall lead to 's Joaquim Rodríguez, who held a one-second advantage over Flecha's teammate Chris Froome. Clarke assumed the lead of both the points and mountains classifications.

Stage 5
22 August 2012 — Logroño to Logroño, 

Following two consecutive summit finishes, before another one in the succeeding stage of the race, the fifth stage of the race was a circuit race around the city of Logroño in the La Rioja region. The sprint points were held  prior to the conclusion of the third and fifth laps, although it was widely expected that the stage would end up in a sprint finish.  rider Javier Chacón broke away from the rest of the field almost from the start of the stage, and managed to get clear without the help of a breakaway companion.

After a quarter of the stage, Chacón held a maximum lead of almost 12 minutes over the rest of the field, but  started to lift the pace in the peloton in the long bid to bring back Chacón. With added help from the teammates of Rodríguez, the peloton had reduced Chacón's advantage to around four-and-a-half minutes at the midpoint of the stage. He was ultimately brought back to the main field with just under  of the stage remaining. The final lap of the circuit saw many of the sprint trains head towards the front of the group; under the flamme rouge, it was  – for Daniele Bennati – and Gianni Meersman's  outfit, that were at the head of proceedings with  close behind. Bennati launched his sprint first, but with help from teammate Simon Geschke, John Degenkolb followed Bennati for a time before sprinting past him and won his second stage of the race by around half a bike length. Meersman completed the top three of the stage results, as Rodríguez maintained his overall lead.

Stage 6
23 August 2012 — Tarazona to Jaca, 

The sixth stage of the race was a return to the mountains and the emphasis was shifted away from the sprinters to the general classification contenders, in light of the two punchy, categorised climbs within the final  of the day's stage. After the usual manic start to the day's proceedings on the road, it was a five-rider breakaway that was established at around the  point of the stage.

De Gendt, who was third at May's Giro d'Italia, was the best-placed rider out of the quintet in 60th place overall overnight, but he trailed the leader Joaquim Rodríguez by over seven minutes. Despite this, the lead group was allowed to establish a maximum lead of over four minutes around two-thirds into the stage, before Rodriguez's  squad as well as the  team in support of their team leader Alejandro Valverde started to bring them back. The pace set by the  dwindled numbers considerably on the Fuerte del Rapitán before  moved forward with Columbians Rigoberto Urán and Sergio Henao to protect Chris Froome. After Urán took to the front inside the final kilometre, Froome was first to attack, with only Rodríguez able to respond; Rodríguez himself kicked for the line from  out, and with no response from Froome, he soon moved clear to take his fifth stage win at the Vuelta – having predicted that the climb would make "sparks fly" the previous day – and extended his overall lead to ten seconds over Froome.

Stage 7
24 August 2012 — Huesca to Alcañiz–Motorland Aragón, 

The day's stage was entirely situated within the autonomous community of Aragon, starting in the city of Huesca before heading south towards the outskirts of Alcañiz and the Motorland Aragón circuit, which has hosted several motorsport championship events since being opened in 2009. The finish of the stage itself came on the start-finish straight of the track, having completed almost one lap of the  circuit. Despite the parcours of the  stage being undulating, there were no categorised climbs during the stage, with the day's two intermediate sprint points both coming inside the final  of the stage. As a result, the stage was again suited towards the sprinters due to the circuit's wide, sweeping bends.

They established a maximum advantage of around five minutes in the opening half of the stage, providing no threat to the overall lead of Joaquim Rodríguez as Lechuga was best-placed at over 26 minutes behind. However, Lechuga was the first of the lead quartet to be dropped as the peloton started to bring the leaders back with around  remaining. The breakaway was eventually halted halfway towards the finish, and it eventually resulted in a sprint finish at the circuit, despite  trying to break the peloton, with Chris Froome, Ian Stannard and Ben Swift being part of a six-rider group off the front of the field. Ultimately, points leader John Degenkolb continued his good form in the sprint finishes, taking his third stage victory of the week, after a lead-out from  teammate Koen de Kort. Rodríguez maintained his overall lead of the race, by ten seconds, over Froome.

Stage 8
25 August 2012 — Lleida to Andorra–Collada de la Gallina (Andorra), 

The only stage finish outside of Spain in this year's Vuelta, the eighth stage saw the peloton head north from the start city of Lleida in Catalonia towards the Catalan-speaking microstate of Andorra. After carrying out a loop around the capital Andorra la Vella, via the second intermediate sprint point – the first coming just before the border between Spain and Andorra, in the town of La Seu d'Urgell – and the second-category climb of the Alto de la Comella. After several kilometres of descending, the first-category Collada de la Gallina awaited the riders; the  climb had an average gradient of 8% – with the gradient reaching 15% in certain places of the climbs – while there were also 18 hairpin bends on the climb, drawing comparisons to Alpe d'Huez, where that climb has 21 such corners.

Moinard was dropped in the early stages of the climb, while Meyer launched an attack on his own. Meyer was eventually caught by the top four overall and Daniel Moreno, who had all broken clear of the main field.

Moreno and Meyer fell away from the group, and it was left to the quartet to battle it out. Froome launched an attack from the front just inside the final kilometre, but was quickly covered by his three Spanish rivals; however, Alberto Contador of  launched his own counter-attack having brought Froome back. He held an advantage of several seconds in the closing stages, but he started to slow within sight of the finish line. Froome had been left behind by the other two riders in contention – 's race leader Joaquim Rodríguez and Alejandro Valverde of the  – and the pairing caught Contador out of the final corner, with Valverde taking his second stage victory of the race, just ahead of Rodríguez and Contador. Froome crossed the line fifteen seconds in arrears, which combined with eight bonus seconds gained by Rodríguez at the line, gave Rodríguez a 33-second lead over Froome; although Rodríguez remained pessimistic about his chances overall. Valverde took the blue polka-dot jersey for mountains classification leader, by winning the stage.

Stage 9
26 August 2012 — Andorra (Andorra) to Barcelona, 

The final stage before the race's first rest day saw the riders return to Spanish soil, after its finish in Andorra the previous day. The  parcours was gradually downhill from the start, except for two third-category climbs along the route; the second of which, came within the final  of the stage. The finish itself came at Montjuïc – near the Estadi Olímpic Lluís Companys – which was used for the last Grand Tour stage to finish in the city, when Thor Hushovd won the sixth stage of the 2009 Tour de France.

Almost immediately after the peloton rolled out of the start, the breakaway was formed by four riders. They managed to gather up a lead of almost five-and-a-half minutes during the early kilometres of the stage before they were gradually brought back by the main field. Despite the best efforts by the leaders to prolong their stay out front, they were caught with around  remaining. Chacón's teammate Jesús Rosendo went on an immediate counter-attack, but he too could not stay clear over the field. Rosendo ultimately crashed after being absorbed back into the main field, and had to wait for his front wheel to be changed.

Back at the front, the field remained together on the run into Barcelona, with the teams of the general classification contenders – ,  and  – heading the field as they did so. Alberto Contador attacked prior to the Alto de Montjuïc, but could not get clear enough for the attack to stick. However, a planned attack by 's Alessandro Ballan gained more headway, with race leader Joaquim Rodríguez chasing him down. Ballan's teammate Philippe Gilbert set off in chase of Rodríguez, with the two riders joining together prior to the top of the climb. Gilbert and Rodríguez managed to remain off the front of the field by several seconds, and Gilbert took the stage honours for his first victory of the season, ahead of Rodríguez. With eight bonus seconds on the line, Rodríguez put around twenty seconds into his rivals, with his overall lead over Chris Froome increasing to fifty-three seconds, heading into the rest day.

Stage 10
28 August 2012 — Ponteareas to Sanxenxo, 

The riders also had to complete a circuit of around  before the finish in Sanxenxo.

's Javier Aramendia once again took up a position in the breakaway of a stage, and was joined out front by the most combative rider of the 2011 edition of the race, Adrián Palomares, representing the  team. The duo managed to establish a maximum lead of around seven minutes at one point during the stage, before the rest of the field gradually brought the time gap down. They managed to survive off the front until the finishing circuit, where they were brought back around a quarter of the way around the lap. The sprinters' teams moved forward towards the end of the lap, where ,  and  all looked to set it up for their respective sprinters. Ultimately, it was Degenkolb that was able to out-sprint his rivals – despite having to launch his sprint earlier than he wanted – to take his fourth stage victory of the race, becoming the first rider to do so since countryman André Greipel in 2009. Degenkolb finished ahead of 's Nacer Bouhanni and  rider Daniele Bennati.

Stage 11
29 August 2012 — Cambados to Pontevedra, individual time trial (ITT)

As was customary of time trial stages, the riders set off in reverse order from where they were ranked in the general classification at the end of the previous stage.

Van Leijen was not the first rider to finish the course however, as Rodríguez's teammate Mikhail Ignatiev was the first to do so. Ignatiev, who started three minutes after van Leijen, at one-minute intervals, ultimately recorded a time of 58' 55" for the course, a time which held for around ten minutes until  rider Martijn Maaskant lowered the best time by over a minute. 's Jonathan Castroviejo was next to hold top spot, beating Maaskant's time by over three minutes as he completed the course in a time of 54' 10". It was not until Cameron Meyer started 45 minutes later for  that has time was threatened, with the former track world champion eventually recording a time of 53' 53". Kessiakoff, the time trial winner at the Tour de Suisse in June, beat Porte's time at the respective time-points, and ultimately beat his time by a minute and a quarter.

Kessiakoff's time of 52' 36" was not breached by anybody else to start the stage, and enabled him to take his second time trial win of the season. In the battle for overall honours, Rodríguez was able to maintain his lead in the general classification standings despite losing time to all of his rivals. Alejandro Valverde had been the first of the contenders to start, and he also put in a solid time trial performance with a time of 53' 44", a time that was eventually good enough for fourth on the final stage results. Chris Froome had been expected to win the stage, but could only record a time of 53' 15"; as a result, he lost second place overall to 's Alberto Contador, who, apart from Kessiakoff, was the only other rider to record under 53 minutes for the course with a time of 52' 53", 17 seconds down on Kessiakoff. Rodríguez, who thought he would lose his race lead during the stage, managed to hold on by a solitary second after completing the course with the seventh-fastest time of 53' 52", labelling his performance as a "big step forward".

Notes

References

Vuelta a Espana
2012 Vuelta a España
Vuelta a España stages
Cycle races in Andorra